Dosti Ke Side Effects (English: Side effects of friendship) is a 2019 Indian Hindi-language comedy-drama film directed by Hadi Ali Abrar and produced by Joyal Daniel. Set in North India and Delhi, the film features Haryanvi dancer and reality television show Bigg Boss participant Sapna Choudhary with Vikrant Anand. This Film Also include an ensemble cast of Zuber K. Khan, Anju Jadhav & Neel Motwani in pivotal roles. The film also features Sai Ballal (who acted in television drama shows Udaan (2014 TV series) and Saraswatichandra) and Vaishnavi Mahant. The film was shot in various locations in Mumbai including Film City.

Cast 

Sapna Chowdhary as Shristi
Vikrant Anand as Ranveer
Neel Motwani as Manveer
Zuber K. Khan as Gaurav
Anju Jadhav as Avni
Rebecca Anand (Special Appearance)
Sai Ballal as Dharamveer
Vaishnavi Mahant as Shiristi's mother
Himmayat Ali as local goon

Marketing
The poster of the film was released on 30 October 2018 and the teaser was released on 4 December 2018 in the YouTube channel of Zee Music Company.

Music 
The film's soundtrack is composed by Altaaf Sayeed and Manny Verma. The music is reported to be released by Zee Music Company.

References

External links

2019 films
Films about friendship
2010s Hindi-language films
Hindi-language comedy films